Rodger Corser (born 28 February 1973) is an Australian actor. He is best known for his portrayals of Detective Senior Sergeant Steve Owen in the Nine Network crime mini-series Underbelly, based on the Melbourne gangland killings, Senior Sergeant Lawson Blake in the Network Ten police drama series Rush, and as Dr. Hugh Knight in The Nine Network series Doctor Doctor. He was part of the main cast of Glitch in the role of John Doe/William Blackburn.

Early life
Corser graduated from Deakin University in 1996 with an Honours B.A. in Media Studies. He formed a band called Tender Prey when he was 16. They played their majority of gigs at the Shoppingtown Hotel, Doncaster, Victoria. He was also lead vocalist in a band called Stone the Crows. They played Rolling Stones and Black Crowes covers as well as many original songs. They released "Perfect Face" on a Nu-Music CD in the mid-1990s.

Corser was also the lead vocalist in a 4-piece cover band called "Sideshow Bob" that played around a few Melbourne pubs during the mid-late 90s (1995–1996) – namely at places like the Royal Hotel in Essendon, Victoria, Australia.

Career
Corser's big role came in 1998, when he was cast in the leading role (from a field of 6,000) in the Australian production of the musical Rent. Corser portrayed the role of Roger, an HIV-positive musician. The show played seasons in Sydney and Melbourne and launched Corser into a successful career in television. His other theatre credits include Leader of the Pack and Below. In 2009, he took to the stage in the theatre production Secret Bridesmaids' Business.

Corser played Detective Senior Constable George Newhouse in the final four episodes of Water Rats in 2001. Corser played Peter Johnson in the Australian drama series McLeod's Daughters from 2001 to 2004. He played the lead role of Alex in the Australian movie Let Me Not in 2005. He portrayed photographer Adam Logan in the Australian television series Last Man Standing and Dr Hugh Sullivan in Home and Away from 2006 to 2007. Corser has appeared in numerous television adverts, most notably for car maker Hyundai.

In 2008, Corser was cast as Detective Senior Sergeant Steve Owen in the Nine Network crime mini-series Underbelly, based on the Melbourne gangland killings.

From 2008 to 2011, Corser starred as Lawson Blake in the Australian police drama Rush, which follows the lives of members of the prestigious Tactical Response team (TR), which is based on the real life Victoria Police Critical Incident Response Team, a highly mobile unit that fills the operational gap between general duties police and the SWAT-like Special Operations Group.

Corser narrated the first series of Network Ten's factual TV series Recruits, which shows the people in training to become police officers in the New South Wales Police Force and people who have only just started out on the beat. In 2010, Corser started work on Spirited, a new television series on the W channel on Foxtel.

In 2013, Corser starred, alongside Rachel Griffiths, in the American television series Camp.

From 2012 to 2014, Corser starred in the Network Ten 1970s period drama Puberty Blues as philanderer Ferris Hennessy, abusive husband to Yvonne, and father to series protagonist, Gary. He then starred in the Network Ten drama Party Tricks as Victorian Opposition Leader David McLeod alongside Asher Keddie.

From 2015 to 2019, Corser has co-starred as John Doe in the ABC series Glitch, as well as in the 2015 ABC series The Beautiful Lie, a modern adaptation of Anna Karenina, as Xander Ivin.

He starred as Chief Inspector Frank Carlyle in The Doctor Blake Mysteries in series aired February 2016 - September 2017, series 4, episode 3 - series 5, episode 2.

Since 2016, he has been starring as series protagonist Dr Hugh Knight in the Channel 9 series Doctor Doctor. For his role on this show, he was nominated for the Gold Logie three times (in 2017, 2018 and 2019). Also at the Logie Awards, he has been nominated for the Most Popular Actor award three times (2017 - 2019) and the Most Outstanding Actor award twice (2017 and 2018).

Since June 2021, Corser has filled in for David Campbell on Today Extra when Campbell is unavailable.

Personal life
Corser's oldest daughter, Zipporah Mary Corser, was born in 2002 from his previous relationship with singer Christine Anu.

In 2007 Corser married Renae Berry. The couple learned in 2009 that they were expecting their first child. The pair now have three children.

Filmography

Film

Television

Award nominations

References

External links
 
 Rodger Corser Biography
 Rodger Corser Filmography
 Rodger Corser – Zimbio

1973 births
Australian male film actors
Australian male television actors
Living people
Male actors from Victoria (Australia)
21st-century Australian male actors
Deakin University alumni